The , formerly known as the , is a local political party in Okinawa Prefecture, Japan, seeking an independent Ryukyu, the . Kariyushi is Okinawan for "happy" or "harmony with nature".

History
The party was founded in June 1970, when Okinawa (called Ryūkyū at the time) was administered by the United States. Sakima was the former president of the Public Finance Corporation, a government financial corporation of the Ryukyu Government under US-control, while Nuka was a Chartered Accountant. Sakima became a candidate of the 1971 House of Councillors election, but failed it with 2673 votes. As Okinawa was returned to Japan in the next year, the party prestige was decreased. After 730, a symbolic moment on July 30, 1978, when Okinawa changed back to driving on left as other parts of Japan, the party virtually stopped its activity.

On August 15, 2005, Chōsuke Yara, a president of the T-shirt store called Alice T-shirt Center, resumed the party, making himself as a new party leader. Nuka became an honorable party leader. Yara became the candidate of the 2006 Okinawa Prefectural Governor election, but failed with 6220 votes, or 0.93% of the entire votes. Critics believed this is because the vast majority of Okinawans think the independence is unrealistic . On the other hand, the party was under adverse conditions, as it completely lacked name recognition or an electoral turf, and Yara resided in Tokyo, not in Okinawa. Some found the party gained surprisingly many votes despite these conditions. In fact, Yara's 6220 votes is 2.3 times more than Sakima's votes back in 1970, although Sakima was a celebrity at the time, while Yara is not. Consequently, the party declared victory of the 2005 election. Since Yara gained 1576 votes in Naha alone, the party hopes it may have a seat in the next Naha City Council member election, which will be held in 2009. (In the last City Council election, an election winner with the least vote gained 1841 votes.)

In 2007, the PAFF, a trade union of freeters (part time workers) and foreign workers, alleged the party for breaking the Labor Standard Act and the Trade Unions Act, claiming it fired an officer without a proper reason.

On March 3, 2008, the party changed its name to the current one.

Policies
The party ultimately seeks the independent Republic of Ryukyu,  they pledge the following policies;
To make Okinawa distinct from Kyūshū, in case Japan restructures the current prefectures into states based on regions.
To lower the employment costs of civil officers.
To introduce a sightseeing tax to create the jobs of 5,000 people.
To create more jobs by Okinawa Longitudinal Subway with a shelter (like the one in Sapporo).
To introduce insurance for tourist agents.
To establish regulations to protect nature for tourism.
To offer jobs preferentially to native Okinawans.
To abolish the value added tax on foods.
To hold an international conference for armament reduction.
To teach unique Okinawan history.
The party also claims the Northern Ryukyu Islands (Amami Islands) are part of the Ryukyu Islands. It pledges to collaborate with Amami Islanders to create Amami Prefecture or to transfer the islands into Okinawa Prefecture.

International policies
The party claims it is "not Anti-US, Anti-Japan, or leftist". After the independence of the republic, they consider to negotiate with Japan and the US to create the military alliance between the three. If the negotiation fails, they may consider selling the current US bases by international auction.

They claim Senkaku Islands, currently administered by Japan but claimed by the Republic of China and the People's Republic of China, is Ryukyuan territory.
They claim to support other independence movements in East Asia, namely those of Tibet and Taiwan.

Party flag

The party's official flag is called Sansei Ten'yō-ki , literally the Flag of the Three Stars, the Sky and the Ocean. The flag is designed by Nuka. The party also plans to use it as the flag of the Republic, should it gain independence. Navy and light blue (or blue, according to the party) stand for the ocean and the sky on Ryūkyū. The white star shows morality and reason. The red star shows pride and passion. The yellow star shows peace and prosperity. The red and yellow stars have white borders, as the party put much faith in morality.

See also
 Ethnic issues in Japan
 List of active autonomist and secessionist movements
 Ryukyu independence movement
 Ryukyu Islands
 Ryukyu Kingdom
 Ryukyuans

References

External links
 Kariyushi Club official website

Ryukyu independence movement
Political parties established in 1970
Separatism in Japan
Organizations based in Okinawa prefecture
Regional parties in Japan
Identity politics in Japan
Secessionist organizations in Asia
Nationalism in Japan